Templin Solar Park is a 128 megawatt (MW) photovoltaic power station, located at the former Templin military airport.

History 

The plant was built between 5 June and 30 September 2012.  The electrical connection to the 110kV network, via two substations operated by e.dis AG, was made in April 2013.  The plant covers an area of approximately 214ha.  It consists of 1.5million thin-film modules from the manufacturer First Solar from its factory in Frankfurt (Oder).  The 114 power inverters used were supplied by German company SMA.  The park was built by Bavarian company Belectric.  The construction costs were €204.5million and about 500 people were employed during its fabrication.

See also 

Photovoltaic power stations
List of largest power stations in the world
List of photovoltaic power stations

References 

Photovoltaic power stations in Germany
Economy of Brandenburg
2012 establishments in Germany